EGF-containing fibulin-like extracellular matrix protein 2 is a protein that in humans is encoded by the EFEMP2 gene.

A large number of extracellular matrix proteins have been found to contain variations of the epidermal growth factor (EGF) domain and have been implicated in functions as diverse as blood coagulation, activation of complement and determination of cell fate during development. EFEMP2 (also known as fibulin-4) contains four EGF2 domains and six calcium-binding EGF2 domains. This gene is widely expressed in a range of adult and fetal tissues.

Interactions
EFEMP2 has been shown to interact with P53.

References

Further reading

External links
  GeneReview/NCBI/NIH/UW entry on EFEMP2-Related Cutis Laxa